Jucilei da Silva (born 6 April 1988), known simply as Jucilei, is a Brazilian professional footballer who plays for Atlético Carioca as a central or defensive midfielder.

Career

Jucilei started his career with Malucelli and was transferred to Corinthians after being voted the best player of Malucelli in Paraná State Championship.

He made his debut for Corinthians against Internacional on 10 May 2009, as the team lost 1–0. On 26 July 2010, he was called, by his former Corinthians coach Mano Menezes, to his first appearance for the Brazilian national team.

On 22 February 2011, Corinthians president Andrés Sánchez confirmed that big spending Russian side Anzhi had signed Jucilei, in a deal worth €10 million.

After making 99 appearances in all competitions for Anzhi in just under three years, Jucilei moved to Al Jazira in the UAE Arabian Gulf League on 13 January 2014. He acquired Palestine citizenship to be counted as an Asian player, thus avoiding the foreign quota.

On 28 June 2015, it was announced that Jucilei signed with Shandong Luneng in the Chinese Super League. On 1 May 2016, Jucilei scored his first goal for Shandong Luneng in Asian Champions League against Buriram United. He was also awarded for the player of the match.

On 12 February 2017, Jucilei was loaned to São Paulo for one season.

Style of Play 

According to his former coach Cuca, Jucilei is a great defensive midfielder, "that has technique to advance with the ball and that marks very well." He also can play as centre-back.

Career statistics

Honours

Club
Corinthians
 Brazilian Cup: 2009

Individual
 Campeonato Brasileiro Série A Team of the Year: 2010
 Bola de Prata: 2010

References

External links
 
 
  Profile on Al Jazira official website 
 Profile on UAE Arabian Gulf League official website 

1988 births
People from São Gonçalo, Rio de Janeiro
Sportspeople from Rio de Janeiro (state)
Living people
Brazilian footballers
Brazil international footballers
Association football midfielders
J. Malucelli Futebol players
Sport Club Corinthians Paulista players
FC Anzhi Makhachkala players
Al Jazira Club players
Shandong Taishan F.C. players
São Paulo FC players
Boavista Sport Club players
Campeonato Brasileiro Série A players
Russian Premier League players
UAE Pro League players
Chinese Super League players
Brazilian expatriate footballers
Expatriate footballers in Russia
Brazilian expatriate sportspeople in Russia
Expatriate footballers in the United Arab Emirates
Brazilian expatriate sportspeople in the United Arab Emirates
Expatriate footballers in China
Brazilian expatriate sportspeople in China